Aga Bereho, or ambiguously Bareji (Bariji), is a Papuan language spoken in Oro Province, in the "tail" of Papua New Guinea.

References

External links 
 OLAC resources in and about the Bariji language
 Bariji Swadesh List by The Rosetta Project at the Internet Archive

Languages of Papua New Guinea
Languages of Oro Province
Yareban languages